Outcomes First Group is an English company based in Bolton which provides care for about 750 young people and adults with autism, complex and Social Emotional and Mental Health needs.

It was owned by Sovereign CapitalThe organisation owns and operates 37 schools, 77 residential homes.  It operates the brands Acorn Education and Care and Options Autism   In 2022 it was the fourth biggest provider in England, with 60 homes. Seven of the group’s homes inspected in 2021-22 required improvement. It is now owned by Stirling Square Capital Partners. 

The chief executive officer of Outcomes First Group is David Leatherbarrow

The group comprises:
Acorn Education and Care: Acorn Education and Care is a provider of specialist education and residential care within Outcomes First Group.
Options Autism: Options Autism is a provider of care and education for children, young people and adults with autism, complex needs and learning difficulties.

Facilities

Options Malvern View, in near Malvern. It was found to be inadequate by the CQC in May 2022 and put into special measures. It was found to be inadequate in terms of both safety and management. The CQC found that "The service did not have enough appropriately skilled staff to meet people's needs and keep them safe. Staff were carrying out restrictive actions with people without relevant training on how to do this safely or in line with the person's own care plans and risk assessments. This placed people at risk of neglect or injury because care was not always provided by suitably qualified, skilled and experienced staff." 

Hillcrest Shifnal School, in Shifnal. It was issued with a warning notice by Ofsted in September 2017. The school’s environment was described as “sombre and uninviting”.
Options Applegate House in Barton upon Humber. In the grounds is one of the last-remaining public air raid shelters, which was open to the public for Heritage Open Days 2018.  The organisation created a wartime garden. Residents will be running stalls during the Open Days, selling home-grown produce such as carrots, beans and courgettes and handing out ration books to visitors.
Options Higford School in Shifnal which has been awarded ‘Autism Accreditation’ status by the National Autistic Society.

References 

Autism-related organisations in the United Kingdom
Companies based in Worcestershire
Special schools in England